Jacob Alderman was a Sheriff of London in 1200 and Mayor of London during 1216 from Easter to the Feast of Pentecost when he died in office. He was succeeded by Salomon de Basing.

See also
List of Lord Mayors of London

References

Sheriffs of the City of London
13th-century mayors of London
Year of birth missing
Year of death missing